Robert "Bob" Taylor ( – death unknown) was an English professional rugby league footballer who played in the 1910s, 1920s and 1930s.

Background
Bob Taylor was born on the Furness peninsula, Lancashire, England.

Playing career

International honours
Taylor won caps for England while at Hull in 1921 against Australia, in 1922 against Wales, in 1923 against Wales, in 1925 against Wales (2 matches), and in 1926 against Wales, and Other Nationalities, and won caps for Great Britain while at Hull in 1921–22 against Australia, and in 1926–27 against New Zealand.

County honours
Taylor represented Lancashire while at Hull, and is one of only four players to do so, they are; Ellis Clarkson, Bob Taylor, Dick Gemmell and Steve Prescott.

Challenge Cup Final appearances
Taylor played right-, i.e. number 12, and scored a try in Hull FC's 9–10 defeat by Rochdale Hornets in the 1922 Challenge Cup Final during the 1921–22 season at Headingley Rugby Stadium, Leeds, in front of a crowd of 34,827. Hull F.C. were just one-point behind Rochdale Hornets when  Bob Taylor scored a try in the dying minutes, however  Billy Stone was unable to score the conversion and Rochdale Hornets won the 1922 Challenge Cup.

Club career
Bob Taylor scored 32 tries in 35 appearances during the 1925–26 season, this was the "most tries scored in a Rugby Football League season by a forward" record, until this was extended to 40 tries by Bob Haigh of Leeds during the 1970–71 season.

Club career

References

External links
Stats → Past Players → T at hullfc.com
Statistics at hullfc.com
Search for "Robert Taylor" at britishnewspaperarchive.co.uk
Search for "Bob Taylor" at britishnewspaperarchive.co.uk

1890s births
Barrow Raiders players
England national rugby league team players
English rugby league players
Great Britain national rugby league team players
Hull F.C. players
Lancashire rugby league team players
Place of birth missing
Place of death missing
Rugby league players from Barrow-in-Furness
Rugby league second-rows
Year of birth uncertain
Year of death missing